The 2019 St Albans City and District Council election took place on 2 May 2019 to elect members of St Albans City and District Council in England. This was on the same day as other local elections. At the elections, the Conservatives lost control of the council

Summary results

 42,657

Aftermath

The Conservatives lost the majority control of the council that they had held for four years, since 2015. Casualties of the election included the incumbent Conservative council leader, Alec Campbell, who lost his seat in a landslide.

At the full council meeting on May 22, the Liberal Democrats formed a minority administration, which was voted into power by a margin of 27-22, with eight Labour and Independent councillors abstaining. Alongside the Liberal Democrat councillors, the one Green councillor voted in favour of the Lib Dem administration.

Ward results

Ashley

Batchwood

Clarence

Colney Heath

Cunningham

Harpenden East

Harpenden North

Harpenden South

Harpenden West

London Colney

Marshalswick North

Marshalswick South

Park Street

Redbourn

Sandridge

Sopwell

St Peters

St Stephen

Verulam

Wheathampstead

By-elections  between 2019 and 2021
A by-election was held in Clarence on 3 October 2019, after the resignation of Liberal Democrat councillor Caroline Brooke. The seat was held by the new Liberal Democrat candidate, Josie Madoc.

References 

Saint Albans
St Albans City and District Council elections
May 2019 events in the United Kingdom
2010s in Hertfordshire